The Danger Game is a 1918 American silent comedy film, directed by Harry A. Pollard. It stars Madge Kennedy, Tom Moore, and Paul Doucet, and was released on April 7, 1918.

Cast list
 Madge Kennedy as Clytie Rogers
 Tom Moore as Jimmy Gilpin
 Paul Doucet as LeRoy Hunter
 Ned Burton as William Rogers
 Mabel Ballin as May Wentworth
 Kate Blancke as Mrs. Rogers

References

External links 
 
 
 

1918 comedy films
1918 films
Silent American comedy films
American silent feature films
American black-and-white films
Goldwyn Pictures films
1910s English-language films
1910s American films